Lemar R. Parrish (born December 13, 1947) is a former professional American football player who played defensive back in the National Football League for the Cincinnati Bengals (1970–1977), Washington Redskins (1978–1982), and Buffalo Bills (1982).

Early life
Parrish played football and graduated from John F. Kennedy High School in Riviera Beach, Florida.

College career
He played college football for Lincoln University of Missouri in Jefferson City, Missouri. He was a running back and a four-year letter-winner from 1966 to 1969. In 1969, he set the school's record for longest punt return when he returned a punt 95 yards for a touchdown against Southwest Missouri State University. He also set school records for most punt return yards in a game (129 yards on three returns) and highest average per punt return in that game (43 yards per return). That year, Parrish averaged 16.8 yards per punt return. That, and his career average of 15.5 yards per return, are still school records. He was named All-American in 1969.

Professional career

Cincinnati Bengals
After graduating college, he was selected by the Bengals in the seventh round of the 1970 NFL Draft. Parrish immediately made an impact, not just as a defensive back but also as a kick returner on special teams.

In his 1970 rookie season, Parrish recorded five interceptions, one fumble recovery, 194 yards returning punts, 482 yards returning kickoffs, and scored two touchdowns (one kickoff return and one blocked field goal return). His 482 kickoff return yards came on just 16 returns, a whopping 30.1 yards per return average.

In 1974, Parrish set a franchise record with an NFL-leading 18.8 yards per punt return average (18 returns for 338 yards). In his eight seasons with the Bengals, Parrish was selected to the Pro Bowl six times (1970, 1971, 1974–1977).

After the 1977 season, Parrish got into a contract dispute with the Bengals, and was traded to the Redskins.

Parrish left the Bengals as the team's all-time leader in touchdowns scored by "return or recovery" with 13 (four on punt returns, four on interception returns, three on fumble returns, one on a kickoff return, and one on a blocked field goal return). He was also the only player in franchise history ever to score two "return or recovery" touchdowns in a single game, a feat he accomplished three times.

In a 1970 game against the Bills, he scored touchdowns on a 95-yard kickoff return and an 83-yard blocked field goal return. In a 1972 game against the Houston Oilers, he scored touchdowns on interception returns of 25 and 33 yards. In a 1974 game against Washington, he scored touchdowns on a 93-yard punt return and 47-yard fumble return.

Parrish also left as the Bengals' all-time leader in punt return yards with 1,201, and held the franchise record for punt return yards in a season with 338 in 1974.

Washington Redskins
With the Redskins, Parrish was no longer used as a kick returner, but he still made a big impact, recording nine interceptions in his first year with them, and seven the year after that. He made the Pro Bowl two more times with Washington, in 1979 and 1980. Parrish played with Redskins until 1981.

Buffalo Bills
Parrish spent his final season with Bills before retiring in 1982.

Legacy
In his thirteen NFL seasons, Parrish recorded 47 interceptions for 462 yards, thirteen fumble recoveries for 65 return yards, 131 punt returns for 1,205 yards, 61 kickoffs for 1,504 yards, and thirteen touchdowns. He is one of twenty defensive backs to be selected to eight Pro Bowls.

Personal life
After retiring in 1982, Parrish struggled with a drug addiction, but checked into a Tennessee rehab clinic in 1986 and managed to overcome it and turn his life around.

He later returned to his alma mater, Lincoln University of Missouri, and earned a bachelor's degree in physical education with a minor in psychology. Parrish eventually served as head coach of the Blue Tigers football team from 2004 to 2009.

In 2012, he was inducted into the Lincoln University athletic hall of fame.

References

1947 births
Living people
American football cornerbacks
American football return specialists
Buffalo Bills players
Cincinnati Bengals players
Lincoln Blue Tigers football coaches
Lincoln Blue Tigers football players
Washington Redskins players
American Conference Pro Bowl players
National Conference Pro Bowl players
People from Riviera Beach, Florida
Sportspeople from West Palm Beach, Florida
Players of American football from Florida
African-American coaches of American football
African-American players of American football
21st-century African-American people
20th-century African-American sportspeople